Bryan's Corner (or Bryans Corner) is an unincorporated place in Beaver County, Oklahoma, United States. It is located at the intersection of US-83 and US-412/SH-3 in the southwest part of the county.

References

Unincorporated communities in Beaver County, Oklahoma
Unincorporated communities in Oklahoma